Sebastian Sim (simplified Chinese: 沈岳川; pinyin: ‘‘Shěn Yuè Chuān’’) is a Singaporean author, including of wuxia novels. He won the 2017 Epigram Books Fiction Prize for best original and unpublished novel in the English language written by a Singaporean citizen, Singapore permanent resident or Singapore-born writer for his novel,  The Riot Act. In 2021, he won again in the same category for his novel "And The Award Goes To Sally Bong!".

Biography 
Sebastian grew up with parents who were part of the pioneer generation of independent Singapore. Prior to being a writer, he took up a variety of occupations, including being a bartender, a prison officer in a maximum security prison, and a croupier in a casino.

Literary Activities 
Sebastian first wrote wuxia (martial arts) novels in Chinese: his first series was The Heavenly Chef, written in 2004, and his second series, Tears of the Bat, was written in 2006. The novels were written under the pseudonym "Yuè Guān Míng" (岳观铭).

Let's Give It Up For Gimme Lao! was Sebastian's first English novel. It was a finalist for the 2015 Epigram Books Fiction Prize, shortlisted for the Popular Readers' Choice Awards 2016 - English (Adult) Books Category, and shortlisted for the Singapore Book Awards 2017 (Best Fiction Title). His second English novel, The Riot Act, won the 2017 Epigram Books Fiction Prize. His third novel, "And The Award Goes To Sally Bong!" won the 2021 edition of Epigram Books Fiction Prize.

Works 
 
 
Sebastian Sim (2021). And The Award Goes to Sally Bong. Epigram Books. ISBN 978-981-4901-90-1.

References

1966 births
Singaporean people of Chinese descent
Singaporean male writers
Epigram Books Fiction Prize
Living people